Anna Glennon (born April 29, 1996) is an American professional watercraft (Jet Ski) racer. She is a World Champion and 8-time U.S. and Canadian National Champion. She is known by her nickname, Jet Girl 777.

Glennon won her first National Championship during her first full season of racing in 2013. She is the only woman in IJSBA history to win the Men's Classic Two-Stroke World Championship title.

Glennon established her race team, Jet Girls Racing in 2012. The team consists of two riders, Anna (Jet Girl 777) and Jessie(Jet Girl 888) and their father and mechanic, John (The Boss Man).

Personal life 
Glennon was born to John and Carrie Glennon in 1996. She is from Overland Park, Kansas and has one younger sibling, Jessie Glennon, who is a former personal watercraft racer and Junior Ski National Champion.

Glennon grew up at her family lake home on the Lake of the Ozarks in Missouri. This is where she learned to ride and where she formerly trained.

In 2012, the Glennon family began racing after riding personal watercraft for more than ten years. Her first race ski was a Kawasaki SX-I Pro. After her first race, her father purchased a Kawasaki SX-R 800. which is now her World Championship race machine.

Glennon is a Digital Media Communications graduate from the University of Central Missouri in Warrensburg, MO.

Glennon is involved in supporting the Junior Stars Racing group, she works with young athletes on social media use and sponsorships every year at Junior Stars Day with the Pros in Lake Havasu, AZ.

Glennon was formerly the social media and communications manager for the TPJ Fly Racing professional Supercross and Motocross team.

In February 2018, Glennon was formerly the media and marketing director of Galfer Performance Brakes.

In February 2020, Glennon became the marketing and sales director for Pro Watercraft.

Equipment 
Glennon is most-known for racing the Women's Ski Limited class. Her equipment is built in-house by herself and her father, John. She has also been known to race Men's Ski Stock, Men's Ski Lites, Vintage Ski and Men's Ski GP. Glennon has several Kawasaki SX-R 800s and JS440s, each for different classes.

In 2020, Glennon began racing a four-stroke Kawasaki SX-R 1500.

Glennon has been an advocate for several companies throughout her career. In her first season, she signed her first sponsor, Rad Dudes Freestyle Innovations. Her current sponsors are Nut Up Industries, HEAL United, HydroTurf, ProWatercraftRacing.com, quakysense, ADA Racing, Gasket Technology, Oil Depot, Hurricane Industries, and the Rad Dudes.

Championships 
 2013 Women's Ski U.S. National Champion
 2013 Women's Ski U.S. National Tour Points Champion
 2013 Men's Ski Stock Nauti Water Champion
 2013 Vintage Ski Nauti Water Champion
 2015 Women's Ski Canadian National Champion
 2015 Vintage Ski Canadian National Champion
 2016 Women's Ski U.S. National Champion
 2016 Men's Ski Stock U.S. National Champion
 2016 Men's Ski Two Stroke Limited World Champion
 2017 Women's Ski Nauti Water Champion

Other accomplishments 

 Glennon is the only woman to win the Men's Two Stroke World Championship.

References 

1996 births
Living people
American motorboat racers